Friends Select School (FSS) is a college-preparatory, Quaker school for pre-kindergarten through 12th grade located at 1651 Benjamin Franklin Parkway at the intersection of Cherry and N. 17th Streets in Center City, Philadelphia, Pennsylvania. With Friends (Quaker) education dating to 1689, Friends Select, which was founded in 1833, has been located on this site since 1885.  The current building, which includes an office building owned by the school, was built in 1967-69. An adjacent campus building is located across the street at 1700 Race Street (Friends Select @ 1700). The Race Street Meetinghouse, built in 1856, is used by students and faculty for Meeting for Worship each Wednesday and Thursday. The school is under the care of both the Central Philadelphia Monthly Meeting and the Monthly Meeting of Friends of Philadelphia at 4th & Arch (held at the Arch Street Meeting House). The school is currently governed by a board of trustees divided equally between the two monthly meetings that oversee the school.

History
Friends Select School traces its history to the founding of the first Friends school managed directly by the Monthly Meeting of Friends of Philadelphia in 1689. Friends Select has existed in its current form since 1833 and has been at its present location since 1885.  In 1832, a committee was appointed to set up two select schools.  In January 1833, a Select School for Boys opened in the meetinghouse on Orange Street (located from Seventh to Eighth Streets, between Locust and Spruce) and a Select School for Girls opened in the meeting house on Twelfth Street (Twenty South Twelfth St).  In 1885, a new school building on Sixteenth Street above Arch was nearing completion with a capacity for 60 scholars of each sex in the upper schools, and of twenty in each of the Primaries. In 1886, the boys' select school and the girls' select school moved to Sixteenth and Cherry (same location as Seventeenth and Parkway - in 1886 the Parkway had not been constructed).

The school was built on the site of what was originally a Quaker burial ground (the entire block); the remains were re-interred elsewhere to accommodate construction of the Parkway and site buildings.  An additional building was constructed in 1892 and a covered passageway joined the two buildings in 1894.  A succession of additions extended the school along Cherry Street, almost the length of the block.  Construction of the Benjamin Franklin Parkway was completed in 1916.  A modern gymnasium was added in the late 1950s.  In 1965, the school committee became serious about developing 17th and the Parkway for joint use.

The decision was made to tear down the old Friends Select School and to build a new school building and office building on the same site.  Once school closed in the sixth month of 1967, preparations were made to move to the Central YMCA located at 1421 Arch Street.  For approximately a year and a half, the school relocated and classes were held at the Central Branch of the YMCA, about two blocks away, first on the third floor for the 1967-68 school year, then on the fourth floor for the fall of the 1968-69 school year. Construction had proceeded far enough for classes to move into the uncompleted new school building when Christmas break ended following New Year's Day, 1969. The Class of 1967 was the last class to graduate from the old school building, the Class of 1968 graduated from the YMCA location, and the Class of 1969 was the first class to graduate from the current school building.

The current building, which includes an office building owned by the school, was begun in 1967 and completed in 1969. An adjacent campus building is located across the street at 1700 Race Street.  The office building occupies a 110 ft. wide strip along the south side of the property (FSS owns the entire city block on which both structures are located). This building was originally leased to the Pennsalt Chemicals Corporation (later Pennwalt) on a 99-year ground lease to help finance construction of the current school building. Drexel University is the tenant as of 2016.

School structure

Lower school
Class size usually ranges from 12 to 20 students, with assistant teachers providing additional support in pre-kindergarten through grade three.

Middle school
Class size ranges from 15 to 20 students. Students have separate teachers for English, history, mathematics, science, and world languages. Specialists teach music, performance, visual art, and physical education. There is a six-day circuit, so students do not have the same classes every specific day of the week.  Seventh and eighth graders sit for final academic exams. All students receive letter grades supplemented by extensive teacher commentary.

Upper school
Class size ranges from 5 to 18 students, and major courses used to meet five times in a six-day cycle, including a double period for each course. However at the start of the 2020-2021 school year, the upper school switched to a cycle based on the days of the week where all major courses were allotted an hour and five minutes. Faculty advisers counsel students on academic and social issues.  A grade dean, a faculty member who monitors student progress and oversees the grade's advisory structure, remains with the class through graduation.  Advisories, groups of eight to 10 students, also stay together through twelfth grade.

Athletics
The athletic program, open to students in grades five through twelve, helps students build a sense of self-esteem and of community through teamwork and individual accomplishment.  Students learn skills and strategies of the games and participation in the athletic program encourages good sportsmanship, responsibility, and time management skills.

Facilities
Friends Select's athletic facilities include:
25-yard swimming pool
Full gymnasium
Wrestling gymnasium
Weight room
Girls' locker room
Boys' locker room
Roof-top athletic fields (includes 8 tennis courts, field hockey field)
Fitness center
Dance studio
Soccer, softball and baseball fields in Fairmount Park
Vesper Boat House

Friends Schools’ League Participating Schools
Abington Friends School, The Academy of the New Church, Friends' Central School, George School, Germantown Friends School, Moorestown Friends School, The Shipley School, and the Westtown School are the other eight members of the conference.

Student life

The Arts

Lower School

Art

The art curriculum, often interdisciplinary and multicultural, centers on engaging lessons based on the elements and principles of art and design. A major focus each year is the Lower School Artist Study. Weekly sessions in the art room from pre-kindergarten through second grade are taught in half-class groups.

Music

Music is a multi-tiered program offering singing, Orff instruments, movement and at least two stage performances per year. These revolve around thematic studies, or might simply be songs, skits, or dances that develop from students’ collective creativity. There are two weekly sessions in the music room for pre-kindergarten through second grade; three weekly sessions are offered to grades three and four.

Artist Study

For a period each year, the lower school studies a special artist, one whose life provides an interesting story and whose artwork has a special appeal to children. Artists chosen recently have included ceramist, naturalist, painter and printer Walter Inglis Anderson; sculptor and teacher Selma Burke; architect Frank Lloyd Wright; illustrator and author Charles Santore; ceramist Josefina Aguilar; film maker Hayao Miyazaki; and designer/director Julie Taymor. The objective is to experience the vision of an individual artist, learn ways that art is used in various cultures and come to appreciate the choices that each artist makes in terms of work and life. Each student artist creates his or her own artwork based on the themes and techniques of the artist being studied. The study concludes with an exhibit of every child's work and an interdisciplinary music-drama-art performance.

Middle school

Fine Arts

All middle school students take visual arts and music each year. In addition, students can choose to participate in orchestra, ensemble, chorus, or drama. These are performing ensembles. There is also an annual middle school drama production open to any middle school student who wishes to participate.

Upper School

Fine Arts

Students complete at least two fine arts courses. Offerings in the performing arts include Choir, Introduction to Directing, Instrumental Ensemble and American Music in the 20th century. Courses in the visual arts include Art Foundations, Drawing and Painting I and II, Photography I and II, Introduction to Filmmaking, Studio Major, Graphic Design and Metalsmithing.

Philadelphia Museum of Art Research Project

In year two of the Interdisciplinary Sequence, ninth grade students study at the Philadelphia Museum of Art. There, students select a work of art from the Medieval to Renaissance periods as their research focus. The culmination of the course is an evening at the museum, where each student presents a detailed and comprehensive description of a work of art to an audience of parents, friends, faculty and museum-goers.

Extra-curricular activities
Co-curricular involvement is an integral part of each middle schooler's experience. It may include the literary magazine, mainstage theater, student government, peer tutoring, movie night and more. In addition, each student is required to participate in at least one season of after-school interscholastic athletics per year.

Upper school students select co-curricular activities from a variety of options. Opportunities include two mainstage productions each year, instrumental music and choir performances, student government, and such organizations as the Multicultural Student Union, the Jewish Student Union, the Falcon (student newspaper), The Cauldron (arts and literary journal), Worship & Ministry, the Operation Smile Club, and the Mock Trial Team. In ninth and tenth grades, all students are required to participate in at least one season of after-school sports or in one theatrical production. Friends Select competes in the Friends School League and with other independent as well as public and parochial schools.

Notable alumni

 Barrie Ciliberti, former Maryland State Delegate
 Patricia Degener (1924–2008), artist who specialized in ceramics
 Anna Elizabeth Dickinson, lecturer for the abolition of slavery and for women's rights during the Civil War
 Jennifer Freyd, 1974, psychology professor, author, founder and President of the Center for Institutional Courage
 Andrea Kremer, 1976, sports reporter for NBC Sports and former reporter for ESPN
 Louis Massiah, 1972, documentary filmmaker
 John McWhorter, 1983, linguist at Columbia University, author
Peter O. Price, media executive and business person
 Wendell Pritchett, Chancellor of Rutgers University–Camden, Interim Dean and Presidential Professor at the University of Pennsylvania Law School, and Provost of the University of Pennsylvania
 David Schlessinger, 1972, founder of United States retail stores Zany Brainy and Five Below
 Aharon Wasserman, 2005, computer technologist

References

External links

Official Website of Friends Select School
Official Website of Monthly Meeting of Friends of Philadelphia at 4th & Arch
Official Website of Central Philadelphia Monthly Meeting

Quaker schools in Pennsylvania
Educational institutions established in 1833
1833 establishments in Pennsylvania
Private elementary schools in Pennsylvania
Private middle schools in Pennsylvania
Private high schools in Pennsylvania
High schools in Philadelphia
Center City, Philadelphia